"Skybar" is a short story by Brian Hartz and Stephen King. The beginning and ending of the story were written by King and published in the 1982 book The Do-It-Yourself Bestseller: A Workbook, with the publisher, Doubleday, holding a competition in which readers invited to complete the story by writing the middle portion. The entry by Brian Hartz was selected by King as the winner.

Plot summary 
This summary relates to the version of the story coauthored by Stephen King and Brian Hartz.

The story begins with the unnamed narrator recalling the outcome of an event that took place 12 years prior when he was aged 11: "there were twelve of us when we went in that night, but only two of us came out – my friend Kirby and me. And Kirby was insane." The narrator recalls the Skybar Amusement Park, which closed down after a series of deaths that began with seventh grade student Randy Stayner falling 100 feet from the top of the "SkyCoaster" rollercoaster, with his body rolling into the Skybar Pond and never being recovered. 

One night two months following the Park's closure, the narrator's friend Brant Callahan - who is known for his dangerous and outlandish dares, such as persuading the group to stand facing railway lines on which bullets have been placed and await an oncoming train - persuades the group to sneak into the Park and climb up the tracks to the top of the SkyCoaster. Although initially reluctant, the narrator and his friends Dewey Howardson, John Wilkenson, and Kirby agree. They are joined by seven members of the "White Dragons", a local street gang.

11 of the boys begin the 100 foot climb to the top of the rollercoaster track, with Kirby remaining on the ground. The rollercoaster track comprises twin rails with only occasional crosspieces, which the narrator compares to "a ladder without rungs". Climbing with his eyes closed, the narrator is alerted by screaming and splashes, followed by the sound of a rollercoaster car moving along the tracks towards him. Sliding to the bottom before the car can hit him, the narrator flees with Kirby. After looking back over his shoulder at the rollercoaster car, the narrator abandons Kirby; they are reunited outside the Park. 

It is revealed that the other 10 boys who climbed the SkyCoaster jumped or fell to their deaths, and that when the narrator and Kirby looked back at the rollercoaster car, they saw the maimed corpse of Randy Stayner emerge from the car to pursue them. The narrator has dreams of the sight from which he wakes screaming, while Kirby has been confined to a psychiatric hospital.

Publication 
In 1982, Doubleday published The Do-It-Yourself Bestseller: A Workbook, a book to help readers write fiction. Various authors, including King, contributed partial stories that readers were invited to complete. A competition judged by King was held between September 1982 and February 1983 to determine the best submission for King's story "Skybar", with 18-year old Brian Hartz's entry winning.

Reception 
Rocky King described the paragraphs contributed by King as "enticing", noting that "Skybar" exhibits "King's trademark style, quickly establishing the atmosphere."

References

See also 
 Stephen King short fiction bibliography

External links 
 The Do-It-Yourself Bestseller: A Workbook at StephenKing.com

Short stories by Stephen King
1982 short stories
Amusement parks in fiction
Horror short stories
Collaborative short stories